For Fair Elections was an electoral alliance formed by four opposition parties in Kyrgyzstan. It was formed on May 20, 2004, in preparation for the February 2005 parliamentary elections. 
Former Security Council secretary Misir Ashyrkulov was chosen as the blocs leader.

The Alliance consisted of 
El Dobushu 
Ata-Meken Socialist Party
Ar-Namys
Social Democratic Party of Kyrgyzstan

The alliance gained a key member when the Ar-Namys (Dignity) party, the nation's largest opposition party joined the alliance.

Following the Tulip Revolution the alliance collapsed as Ar-Namys joined the new government of Kurmanbek Bakiyev while the Social Democratic Party of Kyrgyzstan later resigned in 2006.

Defunct political party alliances in Asia
Political party alliances in Kyrgyzstan